In geometry, a ball is a region in a space comprising all points within a fixed distance, called the radius, from a given point; that is, it is the region enclosed by a sphere or hypersphere. An -ball is a ball in an -dimensional Euclidean space. The volume of a -ball is the Lebesgue measure of this ball, which generalizes to any dimension the usual volume of a ball in 3-dimensional space. The volume of a -ball of radius  is  where  is the volume of the unit -ball, the -ball of radius .

The real number  can be expressed via a two-dimension recurrence relation.
Closed-form expressions involve the gamma, factorial, or double factorial function. 

Formulas 
The first volumes are as follows:

Two-dimension recurrence relation 
As is proved below using a vector-calculus double integral in polar coordinates, the volume  of an -ball of radius  can be expressed recursively in terms of the volume of an -ball, via the interleaved recurrence relation:

Closed form 
The -dimensional volume of a Euclidean ball of radius  in -dimensional Euclidean space is:

where  is Euler's gamma function.  The gamma function is offset from but  otherwise extends the factorial function to non-integer arguments.  It satisfies  if  is a positive integer and  if  is a non-negative integer.

Alternative forms 
The volume can also be expressed in terms of an -ball using the one-dimension recurrence relation:

Inverting the above, the radius of an -ball of volume  can be expressed recursively in terms of the radius of an - or -ball:

Using explicit formulas for particular values of the gamma function at the integers and half-integers gives formulas for the volume of a Euclidean ball in terms of factorials.  These are:

The volume can also be expressed in terms of double factorials.  For an odd integer , the double factorial is defined by

The volume of an odd-dimensional ball is

There are multiple conventions for double factorials of even integers.  Under the convention in which the double factorial satisfies

the volume of an -dimensional ball is, regardless of whether  is even or odd,

Instead of expressing the volume  of the ball in terms of its radius , the formulas can be inverted to express the radius as a function of the volume:

Approximation for high dimensions
Stirling's approximation for the gamma function can be used to approximate the volume when the number of dimensions is high.

In particular, for any fixed value of  the volume tends to a limiting value of 0 as  goes to infinity.

Relation with surface area 
Let  denote the hypervolume of the -sphere of radius . The -sphere is the -dimensional boundary (surface) of the -dimensional ball of radius , and the sphere's hypervolume and the ball's hypervolume are related by:

There are also formulas in terms of factorials and double factorials.

Proofs 
There are many proofs of the above formulas.

The volume is proportional to the th power of the radius 
An important step in several proofs about volumes of -balls, and a generally useful fact besides, is that the volume of the -ball of radius  is proportional to :

The proportionality constant is the volume of the unit ball.

This is a special case of a general fact about volumes in -dimensional space: If 
This is a direct consequence of the change of variables formula:

where  and the substitution  was made.

For the inductive step, assume that proportionality is true in dimension . Note that the intersection of an n-ball with a hyperplane is an -ball. When the volume of the -ball is written as an integral of volumes of -balls:

Making the change of variables  leads to:

which demonstrates the proportionality relation in dimension . By induction, the proportionality relation is true in all dimensions.

The two-dimension recursion formula 
A proof of the recursion formula relating the volume of the -ball and an -ball can be given using the proportionality formula above and integration in cylindrical coordinates. Fix a plane through the center of the ball. Let  denote the distance between a point in the plane and the center of the sphere, and let  denote the azimuth. Intersecting the -ball with the -dimensional plane defined by fixing a radius and an azimuth gives an -ball of radius . The volume of the ball can therefore be written as an iterated integral of the volumes of the -balls over the possible radii and azimuths:

The azimuthal coordinate can be immediately integrated out. Applying the proportionality relation shows that the volume equals

The integral can be evaluated by making the substitution  to get

which is the two-dimension recursion formula.

The same technique can be used to give an inductive proof of the volume formula. The inductive step is similar to the above, but instead of applying proportionality to the volumes of the -balls, the inductive hypothesis is applied instead.

The one-dimension recursion formula 
The proportionality relation can also be used to prove the recursion formula relating the volumes of an -ball and an -ball. As in the proof of the proportionality formula, the volume of an -ball can be written as an integral over the volumes of -balls. Instead of making a substitution, however, the proportionality relation can be applied to the volumes of the -balls in the integrand:

On the interval , it is possible to apply the substitution . This transforms the expression into

The integral is a value of a well-known special function called the beta function , and the volume in terms of the beta function is

The beta function can be expressed in terms of the gamma function in much the same way that factorials are related to binomial coefficients. Applying this relationship gives

Using the value  gives the one-dimension recursion formula:

As with the two-dimension recursive formula, the same technique can be used to give an inductive proof of the volume formula.

Direct integration in spherical coordinates 
The volume of the n-ball  can be computed by integrating the volume element in spherical coordinates. The spherical volume element is:

Each of the factors in the integrand depends on only a single variable, and therefore the iterated integral can be written as a product of integrals:

Each of the remaining integrals is now a particular value of the beta function:

The beta functions can be rewritten in terms of gamma functions:

This product telescopes.

Gaussian integrals 
The volume formula can be proven directly using Gaussian integrals. Consider the function:

This function is both rotationally invariant and a product of functions of one variable each. Using the fact that it is a product and the formula for the Gaussian integral gives:

where  is the -dimensional volume element. Using rotational invariance, the same integral can be computed in spherical coordinates:

The surface area of the sphere satisfies a proportionality equation similar to the one for the volume of a ball: If  is the surface area of an -sphere of radius , then:

Applying this to the above integral gives the expression

Substituting :

Combining the two results shows that

Geometric proof 

Also,  because a ball is a union of concentric spheres and increasing radius by ε corresponds to a shell of thickness ε. Thus, ; equivalently, .

 follows from existence of a volume-preserving bijection between the unit sphere  and :
 
( is an n-tuple; ; we are ignoring sets of measure 0). For , a similar argument was originally made by Archimedes in On the Sphere and Cylinder.

Balls in  norms 
There are also explicit expressions for the volumes of balls in  norms.

and an  ball is the set of all vectors whose  norm is less than or equal to a fixed number called the radius of the ball. The case  is the standard Euclidean distance function, but other values of  occur in diverse contexts such as information theory, coding theory, and dimensional regularization.

The volume of an  ball of radius  is

These volumes satisfy recurrence relations similar to those for :

and 

which can be written more concisely using a generalized binomial coefficient,

For , one recovers the recurrence for the volume of a Euclidean ball because .

These agree with elementary calculations of the volumes of cross-polytopes and hypercubes.

Relation with surface area 
While the volume can be expressed as an integral over the surface areas using the coarea formula, the coarea formula contains a correction factor that accounts for how the -norm varies from point to point. This can be seen most simply by applying the divergence theorem to the vector field  to get

     

Generalizations 
The volume formula can be generalized even further. For positive real numbers , define the  ball with limit  to be

The volume of this ball has been known since the time of Dirichlet:

Comparison to  norm 
Using the harmonic mean  and defining , the similarity to the volume formula for the  ball becomes clear.

See also
 -sphere
 Sphere packing
 Hamming bound

References

External links
Derivation in hyperspherical coordinates 
 Hypersphere on Wolfram MathWorld
 Volume of the Hypersphere at Math Reference

Multi-dimensional geometry